Caio Godoy Ormenese (1995) is a Brazilian road cyclist, currently dedicating to triathlon. 
Caio was a professional road cyclist form 2014 to 2018, racing for teams like Hidropel Criciuma, Bretagne-Seché, the Swiss CMC UCI, and Brazilian Cyclist racing Team. Caio was suspended until March 30, 2022.

Biography
Caio Godoy was born on April 24, 1995. He got his first MTB bike when he was 8 years old, as a gift from his parents. 
With 10 years old, Caio got a road bike from his parents and on 13 years old he moved to a city to be part of a junior cyclist team for the Iracemapolis city.

When he was 15 years old, Caio was hired on Hidropell Criciuma Team, where he raced until he was 18 years old. During his time with Criciuma team he had showed results on national and international races.

In 2018, he was provisionally suspended by the Brazilian Cycling Federation after having tested positive for recreational substances during the Vuelta del Uruguay. Godoy claimed to have drunk mate mixed with coca leaves without knowing. He was later suspended for four years until March 30, 2022.

Since then, he dedicated for triathlon training, and in 2022 Caio made his debut on Triathlon races on an IronMan 70.3 Florianopolis, making it on 04:10:21, with 13th on Overall Rank, third in his age group M25-29.

In May 2022, Caio completed his first Ironman race, in 9:02:42h, with another third place in his age group M25-29.

Major results
2012
 1st  Road race, National Junior Road Championships
2016
 National Under-23 Road Championships
1st  Time trial
1st  Road race
2017
 National Under-23 Road Championships
1st  Road race
3rd Time trial

References

1995 births
Living people
Brazilian male cyclists
Brazilian road racing cyclists